Masamori (written: 正盛, 正納, 政盛, 昌盛 or 昌守) is a masculine Japanese given name. Notable people with the name include:

 (1827–1885), Japanese daimyō 
 (1606–1651), Japanese daimyō
 (1791–1820), Japanese daimyō
 (born 1974), Zainichi Korean boxer
 (1534–1582), Japanese samurai
 (died 1513), Japanese samurai
 (1585–1648), Japanese samurai and daimyō

Japanese masculine given names